Benjamin Platt Thomas (February 22, 1902 – November 29, 1956) was an American historian and biographer of Abraham Lincoln.  In 1952 he published a best-selling one volume biography on Lincoln entitled Abraham Lincoln: A Biography (Knopf, 1952). Thomas killed himself on November 29, 1956. Three days before, his doctor had confirmed Thomas's suspicion, that since the preceding summer, he had throat cancer.

Books
 "Lincoln's Humor" and Other Essays. Urbana: University of Illinois Press, 2002. (with Michael Burlingame)
 Stanton; The Life and Times of Lincoln's Secretary of War. New York: Knopf, 1962. (with Harold Melvin Hyman)
 Three Years with Grant. New York: Knopf, 1955. (with Sylvanus Cadwallader)
 Abraham Lincoln: A Biography. New York: Knopf, 1952. 
 Theodore Weld, Crusader for Freedom. New Brunswick: Rutgers University Press, 1950.
 Portrait for Posterity: Lincoln and His Biographers. New Brunswick [N.J.]: Rutgers University Press, 1947.
 Lincoln, 1847-1853, Being the Day-by-Day Activities of Abraham Lincoln from January 1, 1847 to December 31, 1853. Springfield, Ill: Abraham Lincoln Association, 1936.
 Lincoln's New Salem. Springfield, Ill: Abraham Lincoln Association, 1934.
 Russo-American Relations, 1815-1867. Baltimore: The Johns Hopkins Press, 1930.

References

External links
 
 

1902 births
1956 deaths
20th-century American historians
American male non-fiction writers
Place of birth missing
1956 suicides
20th-century American male writers
Suicides in the United States